Helcystogramma juventellus is a moth in the family Gelechiidae. It was described by Walsingham in 1897. It is found in Jamaica and Mexico (Tabasco).

The wingspan is about 7 mm. The forewings are whitish on the costal half towards the base, becoming greyish towards the dorsum and brownish ochreous about and beyond the end of the cell. There is a slender black streak at the extreme base of the costa, followed by a very short oblique black streak at one-fourth and a broader oblique black streak at the middle. This is separated by a narrow oblique white streak from an elongate blackish costal blotch, which is somewhat triangular and terminates in a curved reduplicated blackish line in the apical cilia. This blotch contains an outwardly oblique slender line, pointing to a small black spot in a white patch before the apex, another slender white line meeting it at an angle from the dorsum. There is a small pale space on the fold at about half the wing-length, containing a few blackish scales. The terminal cilia is hoary, speckled with greyish fuscous. The hindwings are greyish brown.

References

Moths described in 1897
juventellus
Moths of Central America
Moths of the Caribbean